The Tribute Communities Centre, formerly known as the General Motors Centre or GM Centre, GMC for short, is a multi-purpose arena located in downtown Oshawa, Ontario, Canada, which opened in November 2006. The arena was constructed to replace the Oshawa Civic Auditorium. The main tenant is the Oshawa Generals of the Ontario Hockey League, and formerly the Durham TurfDogs of the Canadian Lacrosse League. It features the Oshawa Sports Hall of Fame, Prospects Bar and Grill, an Oshawa Generals retail store, executive seating and special club seats. The name was changed to Tribute Communities Centre on November 1, 2016.

History
The Tribute Communities Centre is owned by the city of Oshawa. On October 5, 2006, General Motors obtained the naming rights of the arena. The City originally selected Maple Leaf Sports & Entertainment (MLSE) to manage the building but, after disappointing results in the first year and a half, MLSE requested in March 2008 that its contract be terminated. MLSE had been attempting to get into the business of managing facilities beyond those where their sports teams played but decided to withdraw, with Bob Hunter, MLSE's Vice President of venues and entertainment, saying that managing the arena was "no longer a strategic focus for us". Global Spectrum assumed control of the operations and management of the arena on June 30, 2008.

On April 14, 2016, they announced an agreement to replace the videoboard in the building. It meets Canadian Hockey League requirements for a future Memorial Cup bid, and replaces the old videoboard, which was a point of contention for Generals fans over the past few years.

An announcement was made on October 7, 2016 that the facility would be renamed the Tribute Communities Centre effective November 1, 2016. The new naming rights are currently set to last for ten years.

2015 Pan American Games
For the 2015 Pan American Games the facility hosted both weightlifting and boxing events. During the games, the facility was configured to hold roughly 3,000 spectators per session. During Games time the facility was known as the Oshawa Sports Centre.

References

External links

Indoor arenas in Ontario
Indoor ice hockey venues in Canada
Ontario Hockey League arenas
Oshawa Generals
Sports venues in Oshawa
Venues of the 2015 Pan American Games
Maple Leaf Sports & Entertainment
Oshawa Power
Boxing venues in Ontario